Homalopoma quantillum is a species of sea snail, a marine gastropod mollusk in the family Colloniidae.

Subspecies
 Homalopoma quantillum carmineum (Bartsch, 1915)
 Homalopoma quantillum quantillum (Gould, 1861)

Description
The size of the shell varies between 2 mm and 3.5 mm. It is a small, rose-colored, solid shell with a depressed-orbicular shape. it contains four whorls. The aperture is circular. The outer lip is thick. The columella has a strong slope. The periphery of the base is blunt.

Distribution
This marine species has been found off Jeffrey's Bay, South Africa

References

 Kilburn, R.N. & Rippey, E. (1982) Sea Shells of Southern Africa. Macmillan South Africa, Johannesburg, xi + 249 pp. page(s): 48

External links
 

Colloniidae
Gastropods described in 1861